Martha Wayne ( Kane) is a fictional character appearing in American comic books published by DC Comics, commonly in association with the superhero Batman. She is the mother of Bruce Wayne (Batman), and wife of Dr. Thomas Wayne as well as the paternal grandmother of Damian Wayne, the fifth Robin. After she and her husband are murdered in a street robbery, her son becomes inspired to fight crime as the vigilante known as Batman.

Background
Martha Wayne first appeared in Detective Comics #33 (November 1939) in a story by Bob Kane and Bill Finger which detailed the origin of Batman. Initially little more than a cipher whose death inspired her heroic son, later comics would expand upon her history.

Born Martha Kane (a maiden name given in homage to co-creator Bob Kane), Martha was the heir to the Kane Chemical fortune and a member of one of Gotham City's wealthiest families. It has been revealed she is related to both Jacob Kane, his daughter Kate Kane (Batwoman) in Detective Comics #934, and Bette Kane (Flamebird) in Batwoman #25. Martha had a reputation as a notorious party girl, socialite, and debutante, frequenting all the most prestigious country clubs, night clubs, and soirees. She also had a developed social conscience and often used her family's wealth and status to champion causes and charities.

As revealed in the miniseries Batman: Family by John Francis Moore, Martha's closest friend in those days was the woman Celia Kazantkakis. Both were renowned for their beauty, which caught the attention of a gangster named Denholm. Martha dated Denholm for a time prior to meeting Thomas Wayne, though she was unaware of his true nature at the time. Celia, who had had previous dealings with Denholm, became very protective of her friend and conspired to get this thug out of her life. In the process it came to light just why Celia was familiar with him. Celia, it turned out, was a criminal herself and had been embezzling money from an orphanage that was one of Martha's charities. She attempted to hide the evidence of this by setting fire to the building but Martha discovered her duplicity. Before Celia departed for her family's home in Greece, Martha threatened to expose her should she ever return to Gotham. Celia would return to Gotham many years later as "Athena", the leader of a criminal cartel. In this guise, she attempted to stage a coup of Wayne Enterprises, until Batman discovered the true nature of his mother's history with Celia and defeated her.

Shortly after Celia's departure, Martha met and fell in love with prominent physician and philanthropist Dr. Thomas Wayne. They were wed soon after and Martha eventually gave birth to their son Bruce Wayne.

Murder

When Bruce Wayne was eight years old, his parents took him to a screening of a Zorro movie at a cinema in Gotham's Park Row. Returning to the car through an alley, they were confronted by a lone gunman, who attempted to steal Martha Wayne's pearl necklace, an anniversary gift from Thomas. In the ensuing struggle, the thief shot both the Waynes dead (Later versions of the story claimed that only Thomas was shot; Martha died instead from the "shock" of his murder due to her having a weak heart. This retcon was ultimately undone, with Martha again being gunned down with Thomas.). In the wake of this tragedy, Park Row was given the nickname "Crime Alley".

The identity of the Waynes' killer has varied through different versions of the Batman story. Initially, he was said to be the criminal Joe Chill. Later retellings would claim that Chill had been hired by gangster Lew Moxon, an enemy of Thomas Wayne, and told to make the killings look like a robbery. After DC Comics' history-altering Zero Hour series, this interpretation was abandoned in favor of the Waynes' deaths being a random street crime. The killer was thought to have never been caught, adding to the tragedy and universality of Batman's origin. After the further continuity tweaks of the Infinite Crisis miniseries, DC has once again returned to the Joe Chill interpretation.

Since her death, Martha Wayne has only appeared in the Batman series in flashback and in the occasional out-of-body experience or hallucination. Her most significant appearance in this latter category is in the miniseries Batman: Death and the Maidens by Greg Rucka. In this story, Batman ingests an elixir given to him by his enemy Ra's al Ghul, and believes he is having a conversation with his dead parents. Martha is depicted here as a beautiful woman whose face is marred by a bleeding bullet wound, suggesting that Bruce remembers her this way because he has become 'focused' on her death rather than her life, the wound vanishing after she forces him to acknowledge that issue. Martha strongly disapproves of her son's costumed crusade, fearing he has thrown away his chance for happiness, although her husband notes that they disapprove of what being Batman has cost Bruce rather than disapproving of Batman himself. As she and Thomas depart, they assure Bruce that just because the passing of time has lessened his grief does not mean that he no longer cares for them, and, as a result, Bruce is able to accept that he is Batman because he chooses to be, not because he has to be.

In Jeph Loeb's Batman stories, Bruce feels responsible for his parents' murder because he advised Martha to wear the infamous pearl necklace the night she was murdered. Had she not worn it, the mugger might have not killed them, or even have been attracted to them. In Death and the Maidens she claims that the pearls were fakes, and that she wouldn't have worn real ones simply to go to the theater. As this experience may have been merely a hallucination, it is unknown whether or not this is true.

Alleged double life
Another mystery about Martha Wayne's final fate is unveiled in the Batman R.I.P. storyline, where it is revealed that the Kanes hired a detective to prowl about the circumstances of her death, always suspecting that Thomas Wayne married her for her money.

Many years later, the detective hired by the Kanes presents to Commissioner Gordon a dossier describing Martha as a helpless, frail woman hooked on drugs by an abusive husband, who frequently indulged in orgies and extramarital affairs, taking Alfred Pennyworth as her lover. However, the villainous Simon Hurt, head of the Black Glove cabal, bent on getting revenge on Batman admits that the stories and supposed evidence are clever forgeries designed to break Batman.

Streets of Gotham
In the series Streets of Gotham, Martha Wayne's history as a young woman was revised and elaborated further.

After her father was tricked into a shady investment deal by a mobster named Judson Pierce, which drained the Kane fortune and made him suffer a fatal heart attack, Martha became involved with charity work focusing on Gotham's poorest citizens. One of her main projects was raising support for the free clinic founded in Gotham's slums by doctor Leslie Thompkins.

During an attempt to solicit support from Gotham's elite, she had her first encounter with Thomas Wayne. Aside from being a well-regarded surgeon, Thomas was also an infamous playboy and party animal. He affirmed this reputation by being extremely drunk in public and vomiting on Martha's shoes, causing her to storm off in disgust despite his apologies.

Leslie's clinic also became a new target for Judson Pierce after he deemed it a key point for taking over the surrounding neighborhood. Pierce attempted to prey on Martha's poverty by offering cash to shut the facility down. Martha accepted Pierce's money, but filed it as a donation to keep the clinic running. Enraged, Pierce arranged to have Martha and Leslie assassinated.

Martha met Thomas Wayne a second time after he had Alfred chauffeur him to the clinic so he could apologize again. That same evening though, Pierce's hitmen also decided to make their move. Alfred was able to subdue the assailants, but not before Leslie suffered a minor gunshot wound. While Leslie recovered from her injury, Thomas volunteered to work in the clinic alongside Martha. Thomas became content with the work there and it wasn't long before Thomas and Martha became romantically involved. By the time Leslie returned to work, Thomas became an official sponsor of the clinic and used his vast resources to keep it running. Thomas also distanced himself from his hedonistic past, citing Martha as his inspiration to change.

The New 52
In September 2011, The New 52 rebooted DC's continuity. In this new timeline, Martha Wayne is seen as a good, strong-willed mother worried about her child's future and the future of Gotham's children as well. It is revealed that when Bruce was three years-old, Martha was pregnant with a second child named Thomas Wayne Jr. Due to an accident orchestrated by the Court of Owls, the child was born prematurely and sent to Willowwood Asylum, although he is officially listed as having died 12 hours after his birth. After the murder of Thomas and Martha, the asylum ceased to receive proper funding and the staff started to abuse the children in their care. The Court of Owls offers to take a child who is possibly Thomas Jr. into their ranks, and he is reborn as Lincoln March, a Gotham socialite and mayoral candidate. Thomas Jr/Lincoln blames Bruce for their parents' murders and the abuse he suffered, and becomes obsessed with getting revenge against his brother. Whether Lincoln really is Bruce's brother or a ploy set by the Court of Owls in order to enlist him in their ranks is left ambiguous; Bruce acknowledges that the evidence favoring March being Thomas Jr. makes sense, but is certain that his parents would have told him if he had a brother.

Other versions

Superman: Red Son
In Mark Millar's Superman: Red Son, Martha and her husband are anti-communist protesters in the Soviet Union. They are executed by the NKVD under Commissar Pyotr Roslov, which leads to their son vowing to overthrow the Communist Party of the Soviet Union.

Batman: Dark Knight Dynasty

In Batman: Dark Knight Dynasty, Thomas and Martha are saved from death when 'Valentin Sinclair' — really Vandal Savage, a man who has a long-standing interest and admiration for the Wayne family despite the fact that they often end up opposing him when they learn about his plans — scared off Joe Chill, Sinclair becoming a partner in Wayne Enterprises, only for Sinclair to have them killed when they threaten to expose his plan to divert a meteor that gave him his powers back to Earth so that he can study it. Their deaths — triggered by Sinclair's fear-inducing henchman Scarecrone causing them to remember the mugging, driving them to flee Chill by running off their balcony — prompt Bruce to become Batman to investigate, Gordon having written their deaths off as an accident and Bruce unwilling to investigate as himself because of the risk to his new wife, Julie Madison.

Flashpoint

The alternate universe Flashpoint version of Martha Wayne is the Joker (and even resembles Heath Ledger's portrayal as seen in The Dark Knight). After Bruce Wayne is shot and killed by Joe Chill, Martha is unable to cope with her loss so she cuts open her cheeks to create a faux smile.

As Joker, she is the nemesis of Batman, who is her husband Thomas and uses Yo-Yo as a henchman. She kidnaps Harvey Dent's son and daughter. Joker kills James Gordon after she tricks Gordon into shooting Harvey's daughter (disguised as the Joker). After Dent's son and daughter are saved, Batman confronts Joker about their son's death. As Batman has recently met Barry Allen, Martha learns that there is a way to rewrite history where Bruce will live although they will die. Realizing that her son will be Batman in that timeline, Martha flees in horror, falling to her death in the caverns below Wayne Manor.

When the Flashpoint reality was restarted during the "Flashpoint Beyond" storyline, Joker was revealed to have survived the fall and started targeting anyone who had anything to do with time travel. She was revealed to have allied with Gilda Dent when she was incarcerated at Arkham Asylum. Batman figured out that Martha was still alive when he was told by Oswald Cobblepot that Dexter Dent went to go see Martha in prison. Batman finds that Joker had enlisted scientists to build a Time Sphere and gutted them once they have served their purpose. Joker tries to use the Time Sphere only for it to explode. The Flashpoint timeline stabilizes when both Batman and Joker come to terms that their reality would be better without Bruce. Joker was last seen in a special cell in the Batcave as Batman and Dexter as Robin head out to fight the Kryptonian invaders. She does offer to hook them up with a contact if they are in need of Kryptonite.

Planetary
In an alternate universe ruled by the tyrannical 'Planetary' organization, Martha and her husband were part of a makeshift 'League of Justice', an underground cell trying to revolt. They were murdered by Elijah Snow.

Earth One
In the graphic novel Batman: Earth One, Martha's maiden name was Arkham instead of Kane in this alternate continuity. Martha's father was murdered by her mother when she was twelve, leaving her family with a series of scandals, including a rumor that the Arkham bloodline is peremptorily insane. Martha was a campaign manager of her husband's mayoral campaign against Oswald Cobblepot. Cobblepot had planned to have a corrupt cop, Jacob Weaver, murder Thomas, but a mugger got to her family first and killed both her and her husband, leaving Bruce orphaned.

Holy Terror
In the Elseworlds novel Batman: Holy Terror Martha works with Thomas and other medical professionals in an underground clinic treating victims of the religious theocracy that rules most of the planet. In one example she makes note of a man that had been tortured to try to change his homosexuality.

The New 52: Earth 3
Martha Wayne's Earth 3 counterpart is featured in Forever Evil. In the revised Earth 3 alternate universe of "The New 52", all characters from the mainstream universe have corresponding counterparts albeit these counterparts are either a darker or outright evil version of the character. Martha is the abusive and sadistic mother of Owlman, in contrast to Batman's mother being a kind woman who fought against child abuse and corruption. Martha blames her husband's surgical fetish for the family's huge expenses, despite the fact that she herself frequently indulges in the family fortune. Owlman orchestrates his parents' murder with the Alfred of Earth 3. Owlman later wonders why Batman would dedicate his life to avenging his parents' deaths.

When Earth 3 was rebooted during the "Infinite Frontier" storyline, Martha Wayne and Thomas Wayne Sr. were depicted as criminals. After they caused the death of Jimmy Gordon Jr., Boss Gordon sent Harvey Bullock to kill them where Bruce was also killed and Thomas Wayne Jr. was left alive. Years later, Thomas Wayne Jr. in the identity of Owlman would learn this fact when he interrogates Bullock.

DC Comics Bombshells
In the opening of the first issue of the comic DC Comics Bombshells, set in an alternate history 1940, Martha and Thomas Wayne's lives are saved by an already-existing Batwoman.

In other media

Television

Live action
 Martha Wayne appears on the Fox TV series Gotham, portrayed by actress Brette Taylor. Her and Thomas Wayne's murder is the main focus of the show's first season. Their murder was first seen in the pilot episode where they are gunned down by a masked man in shiny shoes. This murder was witnessed by Selina Kyle. The episode "Ace Chemicals", revealed that Jeremiah Valeska had abducted a husband and wife who had the same bone structure and build as Thomas and Martha Wayne where he had Mad Hatter hypnotize them and a doctor that works for him do plastic surgery on them. This is part of Jeremiah's plot to re-enact the night when Thomas and Martha Wayne were murdered. When it came to the murder in the alley, Jeremiah had already killed the doubles after they served their purpose and replaced them with a brainwashed James Gordon and Leslie Thompkins with the hypnosis ending when the pearls hit the ground upon their death. This murder attempt was thwarted by Selina Kyle.
 A photo of Martha appears in Wayne Manor in Titans.
 Emma Paetz portrays Martha Kane in the prequel series Pennyworth as part of the main cast.
 In Gotham Knights, murderer Joe Chill states he is a mere patsy in the crime. The Court of Owls works covertly to have his execution carried out before the truth of her murder can be revealed.

Animation
 Martha Wayne appears in The Super Powers Team: Galactic Guardians episode "The Fear", voiced by Lucy Lee. She is depicted in a flashback sequence which was the first depiction of Batman's origin outside of the DC Comics.
 Martha Wayne is referenced in The Batman. Martha is murdered with Thomas Wayne after watching the film The Cloaked Rider with her son but the gunman is never caught. In the episode "The Big Chill", Bruce Wayne has a nightmare in which she and Thomas are murdered by Victor Fries. In the episode "Artifacts" (set in the distant future), Archaeologists mistakenly believe Martha to have been Batwoman while her husband was Batman and their son was the Red Robin.
 Martha Wayne appears in Batman: The Brave and the Bold, voiced by Pat Musick (in "Dawn of the Deadman!") and by Julie Newmar (in "Chill of the Night!"). She appears as a ghost in the episode "Dawn of the Deadman!". The character has a more central role in the episode "Chill of the Night!", where the Phantom Stranger takes Batman back in time to a costume party Martha and Thomas Wayne attended. Martha (dressed in a butterfly-like costume) is hugged by Batman. When Lew Moxon holds Martha hostage, Batman and Thomas team up to fight and defeat the gang of robbers, thus Batman learns new information about Martha's and Thomas's murder.
 Martha Wayne appears in Beware the Batman. In the episode "Monsters", Martha appears in a flashback sequence where she and her husband are shot and killed in front of Bruce Wayne.
 Martha Wayne appears in the Batman Black and White motion comics, voiced by Janyse Jaud.

DC Animated Universe

 In the Batman: The Animated Series episode "Dreams in Darkness", Batman is drugged with the Scarecrow's fear toxin and sees his parents walking towards a tunnel, and runs after them, telling them to stop. They enter the tunnel, which is revealed to be the barrel of a giant gun, dripping blood. Batman screams as everything around him suddenly turns white and a loud shot is heard. In the episode "Two-Face", Batman has a nightmare in which Martha and Thomas blame him for their deaths after Harvey Dent accuses him of being responsible for his transformation into the titular supervillain. In the episode "Perchance to Dream", the Mad Hatter briefly puts Batman into a dream state in which his parents are alive and he leads a happy, normal life; Martha is voiced by an uncredited Adrienne Barbeau. The series also makes use of the rose motif that the films Batman and Batman Forever associate with the murder. Bruce Wayne leaves roses at the site of his parents' murder on the event's anniversary (as similarly done in the comics).
 Martha Wayne has a non-voiced cameo appearance in Justice League Unlimited. In the episode "For the Man Who Has Everything", Batman is affected by the Black Mercy plant and experiences a hallucination in which Thomas saves Martha by fighting off their attacker.

Film

Live action

Batman (1989 film series)

 Martha Wayne (credited as "Mrs. Wayne") appeared in Tim Burton's 1989 film Batman, portrayed in flashback by Sharon Holm. In this version, she and her husband are killed by Jack Napier, when they are ambushed in an alley by the gangster's gang.
 Martha Wayne appeared in Joel Schumacher's Batman Forever, played by Eileen Seeley in a flashback.

The Dark Knight Trilogy

 Sara Stewart played Martha Wayne in Batman Begins (2005). In this version, the Waynes are killed by Joe Chill after exiting the opera Mefistofele.
 In The Dark Knight Rises (2012), Selina Kyle steals Martha Wayne's pearl necklace which prompts Bruce Wayne to track the thief down. Bruce eventually reclaims Martha's necklace from Selina, but this only incites her to steal his car. At the end of the film, the pearls are seen on Selina's neck after she and Bruce become a couple, implying that Bruce must have given them to her.

DC Extended Universe

 Lauren Cohan portrays Martha Wayne in the 2016 film Batman v Superman: Dawn of Justice. During the opening credits, Martha tries to fight the mugger after he shoots Thomas, only to be shot and killed herself when the mugger's gun gets stuck in her pearl necklace. Before dying, her husband whispers her name. When Batman and Superman clash due to Lex Luthor's manipulations, Batman spares Superman when the Man of Steel implores him to "save Martha"; this reminds Batman of his mother, even though Superman is actually referring to his own.

DC Black
Carrie Louise Putrello plays the character in the live-action film Joker which is set outside of the DCEU. She and her husband and son attempt to flee a riot caused by Arthur Fleck, but are shot and killed by one of the rioters in an alley, setting Bruce on the path to becoming Batman.

The Batman
Stella Stocker plays the character in the live-action film The Batman. Similarly to her portrayal in Batman: Earth One her maiden name is Arkham instead of Kane. This version of the character came from a wealthy family with a history of mental illness, and as a child witnessed her parents die in a murder-suicide, spending years in and out of psychiatric hospitals as a result of the trauma. When Thomas announced his run for mayor of Gotham City, reporter Edward Elliot threatened to expose Martha's troubled history to the public. Desperate to spare his wife public humiliation, Thomas called upon his associate Carmine Falcone to scare Elliot into silence; instead, Falcone killed Elliot. Years later, following his failed attempt to kill Bruce Wayne, The Riddler exposes this information to the media.

Animation
 Martha Wayne appears in a portrait shown several times in Batman: Mask of the Phantasm with her husband Thomas Wayne. In the film's backstory, a young Bruce Wayne briefly considers giving up his mission to become a crimefighter after falling in love with Andrea Beaumont, but is torn between his newfound happiness and the vow he made to his parents to avenge their deaths. When Andrea breaks off their relationship and leaves Gotham, a heartbroken Bruce looks at the portrait before donning Batman's cape and cowl for the first time.
 Martha Wayne is referenced several times in The Batman vs. Dracula alongside Thomas Wayne.
 Martha Wayne appears on the direct-to-DVD animated anthology film Batman: Gotham Knight, voiced by Andrea Romano. She appears in a brief flashback shown in the opening of the final segment, "Deadshot", screaming before being shot.
 Martha Wayne / Joker makes a cameo appearance in Justice League: The Flashpoint Paradox, voiced by an uncredited Grey DeLisle. In the Flashpoint timeline, she loses her mind after Bruce's death; Martha's "Joker smile" was from her son's blood as her sorrow turns into insane laughter. Batman later interrogates Yo-Yo for the Joker's whereabouts and also compares Eobard Thawne's psychosis to the Joker's insanity.
 In The Lego Batman Movie, a photo of Martha Wayne, Thomas Wayne, and a young Bruce Wayne is seen when Bruce talks to his dead parents, stating that he saved Gotham City again.
 Martha Wayne appears in DC Super Heroes vs. Eagle Talon, voiced by Asa Ueno.
 Martha Wayne appears briefly in a flashback in Justice League Dark: Apokolips War.

Video games
 Martha Wayne appears in Batman: Dark Tomorrow, voiced by Erin Quinn Purcell.
 Martha Wayne appears in flashbacks in Batman: The Telltale Series, voiced by Lorri Holt. In the game's continuity, her husband Thomas Wayne had criminal ties to Carmine Falcone and Hamilton Hill, acting as a launderer for the groups money. They seized a lot of their power in Gotham by committing those who stand in their way to Arkham Asylum, injecting them with a psychosis inducing chemical to render them insane. Martha's level of involvement with Thomas' criminal activities is unclear. Once she discovered the full extent of his crimes, she became disgusted and resolved to gather enough evidence to get Thomas put in prison. Mayor Hill discovered her plan and sent Joe Chill to kill her and Thomas.

Batman Arkham

Martha Wayne is featured in the Batman Arkham series where she is voiced by Tasia Valenza and Andrea Deck.

 In Batman: Arkham Asylum, under the Scarecrow's fear toxin influence, Batman experiences flashbacks of his parents' murder. A bench in Arkham Asylum dedicated to Martha (and Thomas Wayne) is the answer to one of the Riddler's riddles which leads to Thomas and Martha's unlockable bio.
 In Batman: Arkham City, the Monarch Theatre (the site the murders) is featured in Arkham City. Behind the building is the chalk outline of Thomas Wayne's and Martha's bodies with a bouquet of flowers and Hugo Strange's tape with a taunting message lying by the outlines. The player has the option of paying his respects by having Batman kneeling by the outlines of both. The chalk outlines lasted for so many years, although it is implied by the message that Strange was the one who staged the scenario to torment Batman. Later while succumbing to the Joker's poison, Batman has a hallucination outside the League of Assassins' temple in which his mother appeared standing inside a tunnel to come into the light with her.
 She is alluded in Batman: Arkham Origins. Following the Joker's capture at the Royal Hotel, Batman has a vision of Crime Alley which actually shows Thomas Wayne and then Martha being gunned down by a mugger. The site of the Wayne murders can be found in Park Row's Crime Alley behind the Monarch Theatre. Martha's and Thomas's pair chalk outlines are present along with a single rose. During one of Batman's detective missions, the Dark Knight has to investigate the murders of two acquaintances at Crime Alley, only a few feet from his parents' chalk outline. While reconstructing the crime with Detective Vision, if the player watches the Waynes' chalk outlines, their corpses will appear for a brief moment.
 She is alluded once again in Batman: Arkham Knight. First as a hallucination from the Scarecrow's fear toxin and also since "Martha" is Batman's password to activate the "Knightfall Protocol" which caused Wayne Manor to self-destruct.
 Martha also appears in Batman: Arkham VR.

Novels
In Andrew Vachss' novel Batman: The Ultimate Evil, Batman discovers that, prior to her death, Martha fought against sex trafficking and child sexual abuse, heading a covert detection agency with help from Commissioner Gordon and the family butler Alfred Pennyworth. Batman also discovers that his parents' murder was not a random mugging, but was in fact orchestrated by a pedophile ring that Martha was investigating.

References

Characters created by Bill Finger
Characters created by Bob Kane
Characters created by Gardner Fox
Comics characters introduced in 1939
DC Comics film characters
DC Comics female characters
Fictional socialites
Batman characters
Fictional philanthropists
Fictional murdered people
Vigilante characters in comics
Fictional Irish American people